Head II is an oil and tempera on hardboard painting by the Irish-born British figurative artist Francis Bacon. Completed in 1948, it is the second in a series of six heads, painted from the winter of 1948 in preparation for a November 1949 exhibition at the Hanover Gallery, London.

The figure seems half human, half animal, and has disintegrated to an extent that, like the preceding Head I of the series, the entire upper head has disappeared leaving only mouth and jaw. The figure is set in a shallow pictorial space, and is positioned behind curtains that borrow from Titian's 1558 Portrait of Cardinal Filippo Archinto. The curtains are fastened at one point by a safety pin. John Russell sees the curtains as enclosing the figure, as if the walls of a prison or execution dock. Remarking on their dreary and drab appearance he further speculates that they seem "stiffened by fifty year's crasse of a tenth rate lodging-house; or they could be sliding shutters that has been pulled apart to admit a new victim."

The painting's overall grisaille appearance give the impression of x-ray photographs, and the look may have been inspired by K.C. Clark's Positioning In Radiography, a book Bacon often acknowledged as a key source for his work. The painting contains a small arrow just below the figures mouth; the first appearance of a motif the artist was to continue using for the rest of his career.

References

Notes

Sources

Dawson, Barbara; Sylvester, David. Francis Bacon in Dublin. London: Thames & Hudson, 2000. 
Farr, Dennis; Peppiatt, Michael; Yard, Sally. Francis Bacon: A Retrospective. NY: Harry N Abrams, 1999. 
Peppiatt, Michael. Anatomy of an Enigma. London: Westview Press, 1996. 
Russell, John. Francis Bacon (World of Art). NY: Norton, 1971. 

1949 paintings
Paintings by Francis Bacon